The 2019–20 Montreal Canadiens season was the 111th season for the franchise that was established on December 4, 1909, and their 103rd in the National Hockey League.

The season was suspended by the league officials on March 12, 2020, after several other professional and collegiate sports organizations followed suit as a result of the ongoing COVID-19 pandemic. On May 26, the NHL regular season was officially declared over with the remaining games being cancelled. The Canadiens advanced to the playoffs for the first time since the 2016–17 season, and defeated the Pittsburgh Penguins in the qualifying round, but were eliminated by the Philadelphia Flyers in the first round in six games.

Standings

Divisional standings

Eastern Conference

Schedule and results

Preseason
The preseason schedule was published on June 18, 2019.

Regular season
The regular season schedule was released on June 25, 2019.

Playoffs

The Canadiens defeated the Pittsburgh Penguins in the qualifying round in four games.

The Canadiens faced the Philadelphia Flyers in the first round, but were eliminated in six games.

Player statistics

Skaters

Goaltenders

†Denotes player spent time with another team before joining the Canadiens. Stats reflect time with the Canadiens only.
‡Denotes player was traded mid-season. Stats reflect time with the Canadiens only.
Bold/italics denotes franchise record.

Awards and honours

Milestones

Transactions
The Canadiens have been involved in the following transactions during the 2019–20 season.

Trades

Free agents

Contract terminations

Signings

Draft picks

Below are the Montreal Canadiens' selections at the 2019 NHL Entry Draft, which was held on June 21 and 22, 2019, at Rogers Arena in Vancouver, British Columbia.

Notes:
 The Los Angeles Kings' third-round pick went to the Montreal Canadiens as the result of a trade on June 22, 2019 that sent Columbus' second-round pick in 2019 (50th overall) to Los Angeles in exchange for a fifth-round pick in 2019 (126th overall) and this pick.
 The Los Angeles Kings' fifth-round pick went to the Montreal Canadiens as the result of a trade on June 22, 2019 that sent Columbus' second-round pick in 2019 (50th overall) to Los Angeles in exchange for a third-round pick in 2019 (64th overall) and this pick
 The Edmonton Oilers' fifth-round pick went to the Montreal Canadiens as the result of a trade on June 23, 2018 that sent Hayden Hawkey to Edmonton in exchange for this pick.
 The Arizona Coyotes' fifth-round pick went to the Montreal Canadiens as the result of a trade on February 11, 2019 that sent Calgary's fourth-round pick in 2019 to Los Angeles in exchange for Nate Thompson and this pick.
 Los Angeles previously acquired this pick as the result of a trade on January 24, 2019 that sent Dominik Kubalik to Chicago in exchange for this pick.
 Chicago previously acquired this pick as the result of a trade on July 12, 2018 that sent Marian Hossa, Vinnie Hinostroza, Jordan Oesterle and a third-round pick in 2019 to Arizona in exchange for Marcus Kruger, MacKenzie Entwistle, Jordan Maletta, Andrew Campbell and this pick.
 The Montreal Canadiens' seventh-round pick was re-acquired as the result of a trade on June 22, 2019 that sent a seventh-round pick in 2020 to Philadelphia in exchange for this pick.
 Philadelphia previously acquired this pick as the result of a trade on June 23, 2018 that sent Montreal's seventh-round pick in 2018 to Montreal in exchange for this pick.
 The Winnipeg Jets' seventh-round pick went to the Montreal Canadiens as the result of a trade on June 30, 2018 that sent Simon Bourque to Winnipeg in exchange for Steve Mason, Joel Armia, a fourth-round pick in 2020 and this pick.

References

Montreal Canadiens
Canadiens
Montreal Canadiens seasons
2020s in Montreal
2010s in Montreal
2019 in Quebec